I-368 was an Imperial Japanese Navy Type D1 transport submarine. Completed and commissioned in August 1944, she served in World War II and was converted into a kaiten suicide attack torpedo carrier in January 1945. She was sunk in February 1945 while operating during the Battle of Iwo Jima.

Construction and commissioning

I-368 was laid down on 15 July 1943 by Yokosuka Navy Yard at Yokosuka, Japan, with the name Submarine No. 5468. She was renamed I-368 on 25 January 1944 and provisionally attached to the Sasebo Naval District that day. She was launched on 29 January 1944 and was attached formally to the Sasebo Naval District that day. She was completed and commissioned on 25 August 1944.

Service history

Upon commissioning, I-368 was assigned to Submarine Squadron 11 for workups. On 2 November 1944 she was reassigned to Submarine Squadron 7.

In January 1945, I-368 was converted from a transport submarine into a kaiten suicide attack torpedo carrier, the conversion involving the removal of her  deck gun and Daihatsu-class landing craft and their replacement with fittings allowing her to carry five kaitens on her deck, On 10 January 1945, she and the submarine  took part in simulated kaiten attacks against towed targets in the Seto Inland Sea that lasted 15 days.

The Battle of Iwo Jima began on 19 February 1945 when U.S. forces landed on Iwo Jima. On 20 February 1945, I-368 became the first kaiten carrier to get underway for Iwo Jima, departing the kaiten base at Hikari.

The Avenger overshot I-368 on its first pass, and she submerged. The Avenger returned and dropped a float light marker and sonobuoys, followed by a Mark 24 "Fido" acoustic homing torpedo. At 03:38, I-368′s conning tower briefly broke the surface near the float light marker, but she quickly dived again. All 86 men on board were lost.

On 6 March 1945, the Japanese ordered I-368 to return to Japan, but she never acknowledged the order. On 14 March 1945, the Imperial Japanese Navy declared I-368 to be presumed lost with all hands off Iwo Jima, although she nonetheless was officially transferred from Submarine Squadron 7 to Submarine Division 15 when Submarine Squadron 7 was deactivated on 20 March 1945. She was stricken from the Navy list on 10 April 1945.

Notes

Sources
 Hackett, Bob & Kingsepp, Sander.  IJN Submarine I-368: Tabular Record of Movement.  Retrieved on September 16, 2020.

Type D submarines
Ships built by Yokosuka Naval Arsenal
1944 ships
World War II submarines of Japan
Japanese submarines lost during World War II
Maritime incidents in February 1945
Ships lost with all hands
World War II shipwrecks in the Pacific Ocean
Submarines sunk by aircraft